Louis IV (12 September 1837 – 13 March 1892) was the Grand Duke of Hesse and by Rhine from 13 June 1877 until his death in 1892. Through his marriage to Queen Victoria's second daughter Alice, he was connected to the British royal family. Two of his daughters married into the House of Romanov.

Early life
Louis was born at the Prinz-Karl-Palais in Darmstadt, the capital of the Grand Duchy of Hesse and by Rhine in the German Confederation, the first son and child of Prince Charles of Hesse and by Rhine (23 April 1809 – 20 March 1877) and Princess Elisabeth of Prussia (18 June 1815 – 21 March 1885), granddaughter of King Frederick William II of Prussia. As his father's elder brother Louis III (1806-1877), the future Grand Duke of Hesse and by Rhine, had been married to his first wife since 1833 without legitimate children and from 1868 was married morganatically, Prince Louis was from birth third-in-line to the grand ducal throne, after his uncle and father.

First marriage
On 1 July 1862, Louis married Princess Alice, a daughter of Queen Victoria of the United Kingdom, at Osborne House on the Isle of Wight. On the day of the wedding, the Queen issued a royal warrant granting her new son-in-law the style of Royal Highness in the United Kingdom. The Queen also subsequently made Prince Louis a knight of the Order of the Garter.

Although an arranged marriage orchestrated by the bride's father Albert, Prince Consort, the couple did have a brief period of courtship before betrothal and wed willingly, even after the death of the Prince Consort left Queen Victoria in a protracted state of grief that cast a pall over the nuptials. Becoming parents in less than a year following their marriage, the young royal couple found themselves strapped financially to maintain the lifestyle expected of their rank. Princess Alice's interest in social services, scientific development, hands-on child-rearing, charity and intellectual stimulation were not shared by Louis who, although dutiful and benevolent, was bluff in manner and conventional in his pursuits. The death of the younger of their two sons, Frittie, who was afflicted with hemophilia and suffered a fatal fall from a palace window before his third birthday in 1873, combined with the wearying war relief duties Alice had undertaken in 1870, evoked a crisis of spiritual faith for the princess in which her husband does not appear to have shared.

Military career
During the Austro-Prussian War of 1866, Louis commanded the Hessian cavalry in support of the Austrian side.

The Austrians were defeated in the War, and the Hessian grand duchy was in jeopardy of being awarded as the spoils of war to victorious Prussia, which annexed some of Austria's other allies (Hanover, Hesse-Cassel, Nassau). Hesse-Darmstadt appears to have been spared this fate only by a cession of territory and the close dynastic kinship between its ruler and the Emperor of Russia (Alexander II's consort, Empress Maria Alexandrovna, was the sister of Hesse's Grand Duke Louis III and of Prince Charles).

In the Franco-Prussian War Prince Louis fought on the side of Prussia and the North German Confederation; commanding the 25th Division. He was credited with courageous military service, especially at the Battle of Gravelotte, which also afforded him the opportunity of mending the previous war's grievances with the House of Hohenzollern by fighting on the same side as his brother-in-law and future emperor, Crown Prince Frederick William of Prussia. He had good relationship with Frederick William and his wife Victoria, the Princess Royal, all of his lifetime. He also visited him on his deathbed in 1888.

Grand Duke of Hesse and by Rhine
In March 1877, Louis became heir presumptive to the Hessian throne when his father died and, less than three months later, found himself reigning grand duke upon the demise of his uncle, Louis III.

A year and a half later, however, Grand Duke Louis was stricken with diphtheria along with most of his immediate family. He recovered; but his four-year-old daughter Marie succumbed, along with his wife of 16 years. From then on, he reigned and raised his five surviving children alone.  His daughter Alix married Tsar Nicholas II two years after his death in 1894.

Second marriage
Grand Duchess Alice having died in 1878, Louis IV contracted a morganatic marriage on 30 April 1884 in Darmstadt (on the eve of the wedding of his eldest daughter, for which Queen Victoria and other relatives of his first wife were gathered in the Hessian capital) with Countess Alexandrine Hutten-Czapska (3 September 1854 – 8 May 1941), daughter of Count Adam Hutten-Czapski and Countess Marianna Rzewuska. She was the former wife of Aleksander von Kolemin, the Russian chargé d'affaires in Darmstadt. But the couple, facing objections from the Grand Duke's in-laws, separated within a week and the marriage was annulled within three months. As a compensation, she received the title Countess von Romrod on 31 May 1884 and a financial compensation. Alexandrine later married for the third time to Basil von Bacheracht.

Death
Grand Duke Ludwig IV died on 13 March 1892,  of a heart attack in the New Palace in Darmstadt and was succeeded by his son, Ernest Louis.

Issue

Honours
German orders and decorations

Foreign orders and decorations

Ancestry

References 

1837 births
1892 deaths
Grand Dukes of Hesse
Nobility from Darmstadt
19th-century Prussian military personnel
Burials at the Mausoleum for the Grand Ducal House of Hesse, Rosenhöhe (Darmstadt)
Members of the First Chamber of the Estates of the Grand Duchy of Hesse
Colonel generals of Prussia
Recipients of the Pour le Mérite (military class)
Grand Crosses of the Order of Saint Stephen of Hungary
Recipients of the Order of Bravery, 2nd class
Knights Grand Cross of the Order of Saints Maurice and Lazarus
Knights Commander of the Military Order of William
Recipients of the Order of the White Eagle (Russia)
Recipients of the Order of St. Anna, 1st class
Recipients of the Order of St. George of the Second Degree
Extra Knights Companion of the Garter
Grand Crosses of the Order of the Star of Romania
Recipients of the Order of the Netherlands Lion
Recipients of the Order of the Cross of Takovo
Military personnel from Darmstadt